The Teza is a river in Ivanovo Oblast, Russia. It is a left tributary of the Klyazma, which is in turn a tributary of the Oka. It has a length of 192 kilometers and a drainage basin with an area of 3,450 square kilometers. Annual flooding occurs between April and the middle of May.  It is under ice starting some time between the beginning of November to the beginning of December until some time in April. The city of Shuya is located on the Teza.

The main tributaries of Teza are Lulekh, Parsha, Molokhta, Nozyga, Postna.

The Teza valley was historically an important textile-industry region.

References 

Rivers of Ivanovo Oblast